Paul Plays Carla (sometimes referred to as Paul Bley Plays Carla Bley) is an album of Carla Bley's compositions performed by pianist Paul Bley which was recorded in Denmark in 1991 and released on the SteepleChase label.

Reception

Allmusic awarded the album 4 stars noting "The music falls somewhere between advanced bop and the avant-garde, often swinging but with surprising turns and twists and often-unusual chord sequences. An intriguing set".

Track listing
All compositions by Carla Bley
 "Vashkar" - 6:06
 "Floater" - 4:40
 "Seven" - 6:44
 "Around Again" - 7:04
 "Ida Lupino" - 7:29
 "Turns" - 4:54
 "And Now the Queen" - 6:23
 "Ictus" - 7:28
 "Olhos de Gato" - 7:44
 "Donkey" - 8:08

Personnel 
Paul Bley - piano
Marc Johnson - bass 
Jeff Williams - drums

References 

1992 albums
Paul Bley albums
SteepleChase Records albums